Anastasia Vladimirovna Slanevskaya (born 15 May 1980), known professionally as Slava, is a Russian singer, actress, model, and public figure.

Early life 
Slanevskaya struggled in school due to dyslexia.

Career 
In the spring of 2002, Slanevskaya sang at a karaoke club after work. Television director Sergei Kalvarsky, who's known for his work with Alla Pugacheva and Philip Kirkorov waited until she finished singing. Then offered her a collaboration. Creative producer Oleg Chelishev also took part in this collaboration.

In 2005, the singer took part in the "Eurovision" song contest with the song "I Wanna Be the One".

She was invited for the lead female role in a full-length motion picture Paragraph 78, based on the sci-fi story of Ivan Okhlobystin. Slanevskaya plays the role of Lisa, a female fighter of a special-purpose team and the only woman in the unit of 8 professionals who are on a dangerous mission in a top-secret missile base.

Thank recorded in London debut English album with the working title «Eclipse», and in November 2008, she issued a joint track with Craig David.

Personal life 
On 12 May 2011, at her concert in Blagoveshchensk, Slanevskaya announced that she was pregnant with her second child.

On November 25, 2022, Slava's eldest daughter, Alexandra, got married, and in January 2023 it became known that she was expecting her first child.

Discography

Albums 
2004: Попутчица
2006: Классный
2007: The Best
2013: Одиночество
2015: Откровенно
2019: Крик души

References

External links 
 
 

1980 births
Living people
Russian film actresses
Russian television actresses
21st-century Russian actresses
Actresses from Moscow
Singers from Moscow
21st-century Russian singers
21st-century Russian women singers
Winners of the Golden Gramophone Award